Johann Ludwig Heinrich Julius Schliemann (6 January 1822 – 26 December 1890) was a German businessman and pioneer in the field of archaeology. He was an advocate of the historicity of places mentioned in the works of Homer and an archaeological excavator of Hisarlik, now presumed to be the site of Troy, along with the Mycenaean sites Mycenae and Tiryns. His work lent weight to the idea that Homer's Iliad reflects historical events. Schliemann's excavation of nine levels of archaeological remains has been criticized as destructive of significant historical artifacts, including the level that is believed to be the historical Troy.

Early life and education
Schliemann was born January 6, 1822, in Neubukow, Mecklenburg-Schwerin (part of the German Confederation) to Luise Therese Sophie Schliemann and Ernst Schliemann, a Lutheran minister where today a museum called the "Heinrich Schliemann-Gedenkstätte"  is placed. He was the fifth of nine children. The family moved to Ankershagen in summer 1823. Their second home houses the Heinrich Schliemann Museum today.

Heinrich's father was a poor pastor. His mother died in 1831, when Heinrich was nine years old and his father sent Heinrich to live with his uncle Friedrich Schliemann, also a pastor. When he was eleven years old, his father paid for him to enroll in the Gymnasium (grammar school) at Neustrelitz which he had to leave three month later. Heinrich's interest in history was initially encouraged by his father, who had schooled him in the tales of the Iliad and the Odyssey and had given him a copy of Ludwig Jerrer's Illustrated History of the World for Christmas in 1829. Schliemann claimed that at the age of 7 he had declared he would one day excavate the city of Troy.

However, Heinrich had to transfer to the Realschule (vocational school) after his father was accused of embezzling church funds and made his exams in 1836. His family's poverty made a university education impossible, so it was Schliemann's early academic experiences that influenced the course of his education as an adult. In his archaeological career, however, there was often a division between Schliemann and the educated professionals.

At age 14, after leaving Realschule, Heinrich became an apprentice at Herr Holtz's grocery in Fürstenberg. He later told that his passion for Homer was born when he heard a drunken miller reciting it at the grocer's. He laboured for five years, until he was forced to leave because he hurt his chest, lifting a heavy barrel and coughing up blood. In 1841, Schliemann moved to Hamburg and became a cabin boy on the Dorothea, a brig bound for Venezuela. After twelve days at sea, the ship foundered in a gale. The survivors washed up on the shores of the Netherlands. Schliemann became a messenger, office attendant, and later, a bookkeeper in Amsterdam.

Career

On March 1, 1844, 22-year-old Schliemann took a position with B. H. Schröder & Co., an import/export firm. In 1846, the firm sent him as a General Agent to St. Petersburg.

In time, Schliemann represented a number of companies. He learned Russian and Greek, employing a system that he used his entire life to learn languages; Schliemann claimed that it took him six weeks to learn a language and wrote his diary in the language of whatever country he happened to be in. By the end of his life, he could converse in English, French, Dutch, Spanish, Portuguese, Italian, Russian, Swedish, Polish, Greek, Latin, and Arabic, besides his native German.

Schliemann's ability with languages was an important part of his career as a businessman in the importing trade. In 1850, he learned of the death of his brother, Ludwig, who had become wealthy as a speculator in the California gold fields.

Schliemann went to California in early 1851 and started a bank in Sacramento buying and reselling over a million dollars' worth of gold dust in just six months. When the local Rothschild agent complained about short-weight consignments, he left California, pretending it was because of illness. While he was there, California became the 31st state in September 1850, and Schliemann acquired United States citizenship. Schliemann propounded this story in his autobiography of 1881, though he clearly was in St Petersburg that day, and "in actual fact, ...obtained his American citizenship only in 1869."

According to his memoirs, before arriving in California he dined in Washington, D.C. with President Millard Fillmore and his family, but W. Calder III says that Schliemann didn't attend but simply read about a similar gathering in the papers.

Schliemann also published what he said was an eyewitness account of the San Francisco Fire of 1851, which he said was in June although it took place in May. At the time he was in Sacramento and used the report of the fire in the Sacramento Daily Journal to write his report.

On April 7, 1852, he sold his business and returned to Russia. There he attempted to live the life of a gentleman, which brought him into contact with Ekaterina Petrovna Lyschin (1826–1896), the niece of one of his wealthy friends, whom he married on October 12, 1852.

Schliemann next cornered the market in indigo dye and then went into the indigo business itself, turning a good profit.

Schliemann made yet another quick fortune as a military contractor in the Crimean War, 1854–1856. He cornered the market in saltpetre, sulfur, and lead, constituents of ammunition, which he resold to the Russian government.

By 1858, Schliemann was 36 years old and wealthy enough to retire. In his memoirs, he claimed that he wished to dedicate himself to the pursuit of Troy.

Amateur archaeologist
Heinrich Schliemann was an amateur archaeologist. He was obsessed with the stories of Homer and ancient Mediterranean civilizations. He dedicated his life's work to unveiling the actual physical remains of the cities of Homer's epic tales. Many refer to him as the "father of pre-Hellenistic archaeology".

In 1868, Schliemann visited sites in the Greek world, published Ithaka, der Peloponnesus und Troja in which he asserted that Hissarlik was the site of Troy, and submitted a dissertation in Ancient Greek proposing the same thesis to the University of Rostock. In 1869, he was awarded a PhD in absentia from the University of Rostock, in Germany, for that submission. David Traill wrote that the examiners gave him his PhD on the basis of his topographical analyses of Ithaca, which were in part simply translations of another author's work or drawn from poetic descriptions by the same author.

Schliemann was elected a member of the American Antiquarian Society in 1880.

Troy and Mycenae

Schliemann's first interest of a classical nature seems to have been the location of Troy. At the time he began excavating in Turkey, the site commonly believed to be Troy was at Pınarbaşı, a hilltop at the south end of the Trojan Plain. The site had been previously excavated by English amateur archaeologist and local expert Frank Calvert. Schliemann performed soundings at Pınarbaşı but was disappointed by his findings. It was Calvert who identified Hissarlik as Troy and suggested Schliemann dig there on land owned by Calvert's family.

Schliemann was at first skeptical about the identification of Hissarlik with Troy but was persuaded by Calvert. In 1870, Schliemann began digging at Hissarlik, and by 1873 had discovered nine buried cities.

Schliemann found pure copper and metal molds as well as a lot of other metal tools, cutlery, shields, and vases which were found at around 28 to 29 and a half feet deep at the site.

The day before digging was to stop on 15 June 1873, was the day he discovered gold, which he took to be Priam's Treasure trove. Recent research has confirmed several settlements on the site spanning 3,600 years. The layer that Schliemann referred to as "the Burnt City" and believed to be Troy is now thought to be from 3,000–2,000 BCE, too early to be the location of the Trojan War as Homer describes it.

He later wrote that he had seen the gold glinting in the dirt and dismissed the workmen so that he and Sophia could excavate it themselves; they removed it in her shawl. However, Schliemann's oft-repeated story of the treasure's being carried by Sophia in her shawl was untrue. Schliemann later admitted fabricating it; at the time of the discovery Sophia was in fact with her family in Athens, following the death of her father. Sophia later wore "the Jewels of Helen" for the public.

Schliemann smuggled the treasure out of Turkey into Greece. The Turkish government sued Schliemann in a Greek court, and Schliemann was forced to pay a 10,000 gold franc indemnity. Schliemann ended up sending 50,000 gold francs to the Constantinople Imperial Museum, and some of the artifacts. In 1874 Schliemann published Troy and Its Remains.  Schliemann at first offered his collections, which included Priam's Gold, to the Greek government, then the French, and finally the Russians.  In 1881, his collections ended up in Berlin, housed first in the Ethnographic Museum, and then the Museum for Pre- and Early History, until the start of WWII. In 1939, all exhibits were packed and stored in the museum basement, then moved to the Prussian State Bank vault in January 1941. In 1941, the treasure was moved to the Flakturm  located at the Berlin Zoological Garden, called the Zoo Tower.  Dr. Wilhelm Unverzagt protected the three crates containing the Trojan gold when the Battle for Berlin commenced, right up until SMERSH forces took control of the tower on 1 May.  On 26 May 1945, Soviet forces, led by Lt. Gen. Nikolai Antipenko, Andre Konstantinov, deputy head of the Arts Committee, Viktor Lazarev, and Serafim Druzhinin, took the three crates away on trucks.  The crates were then flown to Moscow on 30 June 1945, and taken to the Pushkin Museum ten days later. In 1994, the museum admitted the collection was in their possession.

In 1876, he began digging at Mycenae, under the supervision of Panagiotis Stamatakis, a Greek archaeologist attached to the excavation as a condition of Schliemann's permit. There, he discovered the Shaft Graves, with their skeletons and more regal gold, including the so-called Mask of Agamemnon. These findings were published in Mycenae in 1878.

Although he had received permission in 1876 to continue excavation, Schliemann did not reopen the dig site at Troy until 1878–1879, after another excavation in Ithaca designed to locate a site mentioned in the Odyssey.  Emile Burnouf and Rudolf Virchow joined him there in 1879.

In 1880 Schliemann began excavation of the Treasury of Minyas at Orchomenus (Boeotia).

From 1882–1883 Schliemann made a sixth excavation at Troy, in 1884 an excavation of Tiryns with Wilhelm Dörpfeld (who emphasized the importance of strata), and from 1889–1890 a seventh and eighth excavation at Troy, also with Dörpfeld.

Personal life
After learning that his childhood sweetheart Minna had married, Schliemann married Ekaterina Petrovna Lyschin (1826–1896) on October 12, 1852. She was the niece of one of his wealthy friends in St Petersburg and they had three children; a son, Sergey (1855–1941), and two daughters, Natalya (1859–1869) and Nadezhda (1861–1935). 
As a consequence of his many travels, Schliemann was often separated from his wife and children. He spent a month studying at the Sorbonne in 1866, while moving his assets from St. Petersburg to Paris to invest in real estate. He asked his wife to join him, but she refused.

Schliemann threatened to divorce Ekaterina twice before doing so. In 1869, he bought property and settled in Indianapolis for about three months to take advantage of Indiana's liberal divorce laws, although he obtained the divorce by lying about his residency in the U.S. and his intention to remain in the state. He moved to Athens as soon as an Indiana court granted him the divorce and married again two months later.

A former teacher and Athenian friend, Theokletos Vimpos, the Archbishop of Mantineia and Kynouria, helped Schliemann find someone "enthusiastic about Homer and about a rebirth of my beloved Greece...with a Greek name and a soul impassioned for learning."  The archbishop suggested the 17 years old Sophia Engastromenos, daughter of his cousin.   They were married by the archbishop on 23 September 1869. They later had two children, Andromache and Agamemnon Schliemann.

Death

On August 1, 1890, Schliemann returned reluctantly to Athens, and in November travelled to Halle, where his chronic ear infection was operated upon, on November 13. The doctors deemed the operation a success, but his inner ear became painfully inflamed. Ignoring his doctors' advice, he left the hospital and travelled to Leipzig, Berlin and Paris. From the last, he planned to return to Athens in time for Christmas, but his ear condition became even worse. Too sick to make the boat ride from Naples to Greece, Schliemann remained in Naples but managed to make a journey to the ruins of Pompeii. On Christmas Day 1890, he collapsed into a coma; he died in a Naples hotel room the following day; the cause of death was cholesteatoma.

His corpse was then transported by friends to the First Cemetery in Athens. It was interred in a mausoleum shaped like a temple erected in ancient Greek style, designed by Ernst Ziller in the form of an amphiprostyle temple on top of a tall base. The frieze circling the outside of the mausoleum shows Schliemann conducting the excavations at Mycenae and other sites.

Legacy and criticism

Schliemann's magnificent residence in the city centre of Athens, the Iliou Melathron (Ιλίου Μέλαθρον, "Palace of Ilium") houses today the Numismatic Museum of Athens.

Along with Arthur Evans, Schliemann was a pioneer in the study of the Aegean civilization in the Bronze Age. The two men knew of each other, Evans having visited Schliemann's sites. Schliemann had planned to excavate at Knossos but died before fulfilling that dream. Evans bought the site and stepped in to take charge of the project, which was then still in its infancy.

Further excavation of the Troy site by others indicated that the level Schliemann named the Troy of the Iliad was inaccurate, although they retain the names given by Schliemann. In a 1998 article for The Classical World, D.F. Easton wrote that Schliemann "was not very good at separating fact from interpretation" and claimed that, "Even in 1872 Frank Calvert could see from the pottery that Troy II had to be hundreds of years too early to be the Troy of the Trojan War, a point finally proven by the discovery of Mycenaean pottery in Troy VI in 1890."
"King Priam's Treasure" was found in the Troy II level, that of the Early Bronze Age, long before Priam's city of Troy VI or Troy VIIa in the prosperous and elaborate Mycenaean Age. Moreover, the finds were unique. The elaborate gold artifacts do not appear to belong to the Early Bronze Age.

His excavations were condemned by later archaeologists as having destroyed the main layers of the real Troy. Kenneth W. Harl, in the Teaching Company's Great Ancient Civilizations of Asia Minor lecture series, sarcastically claimed that Schliemann's excavations were carried out with such rough methods that he did to Troy what the Greeks could not do in their times, destroying and levelling down the entire city walls to the ground.

In 1972, Professor William Calder of the University of Colorado, speaking at a commemoration of Schliemann's birthday, claimed that he had uncovered several possible problems in Schliemann's work. Other investigators followed, such as Professor David Traill of the University of California.

A 2004 article of the National Geographic Society called into question Schliemann's qualifications, his motives, and his methods:
In northwestern Turkey, Heinrich Schliemann excavated the site believed to be Troy in 1870. Schliemann was a German adventurer and con-man who took sole credit for the discovery, even though he was digging at the site, called Hisarlik, at the behest of British archaeologist Frank Calvert. [...] Eager to find the legendary treasures of Troy, Schliemann blasted his way down to the second city, where he found what he believed were the jewels that once belonged to Helen. As it turns out, the jewels were a thousand years older than the time described in Homer's epic.

A 2005 article presented similar criticisms, when reporting on a speech by University of Pennsylvania scholar C. Brian Rose:
German archaeologist Heinrich Schliemann was the first to explore the Mound of Troy in the 1870s. Unfortunately, he had had no formal education in archaeology, and dug an enormous trench "which we still call the Schliemann Trench," according to Rose, because in the process Schliemann "destroyed a phenomenal amount of material." [...] Only much later in his career would he accept the fact that the treasure had been found at a layer one thousand years removed from the battle between the Greeks and Trojans, and thus that it could not have been the treasure of King Priam. Schliemann may not have discovered the truth, but the publicity stunt worked, making Schliemann and the site famous and igniting the field of Homeric studies in the late 19th century. During this period he was criticized and ridiculed of claims to fathering an offspring with a local Assyrian Girl sparking infidelity and adultery which Schliemann did not confirm or deny. '

Schliemann's methods have been described as "savage and brutal. He plowed through layers of soil and everything in them without proper record keeping—no mapping of finds, few descriptions of discoveries." Carl Blegen forgave his recklessness, saying "Although there were some regrettable blunders, those criticisms are largely colored by a comparison with modern techniques of digging; but it is only fair to remember that before 1876 very few persons, if anyone, yet really knew how excavations should properly be conducted. There was no science of archaeological investigation, and there was probably no other digger who was better than Schliemann in actual field work."

In 1874, Schliemann also initiated and sponsored the removal of medieval edifices from the Acropolis of Athens, including the great Frankish Tower. Despite considerable opposition, including from King George I of Greece, Schliemann saw the project through. The eminent historian of Frankish Greece William Miller later denounced this as "an act of vandalism unworthy of any people imbued with a sense of the continuity of history", and "pedantic barbarism".

In his excavations at Troy, Schliemann found many swastikas adorned on pottery and consulted with Aryan nationalist Émile-Louis Burnouf to identify the symbol. Claiming that the symbol was connected with the Aryans, Burnouf adopted and popularised the swastika as a symbol of Aryan nationalism. Schliemann's decision to consult Burnouf can thus be seen as having triggered the use of the swastika as an Aryan nationalist symbol.

Publications

 La Chine et le Japon au temps présent (1867)
 Ithaka, der Peloponnesus und Troja (1868) (reissued by Cambridge University Press, 2010. )
 Trojanische Altertümer: Bericht über die Ausgrabungen in Troja (1874) (reissued by Cambridge University Press, 2010. )
 Troja und seine Ruinen (1875). Translated into English as Troy and its Remains (1875) (reissued by Cambridge University Press, 2010. )
 Mykena (1878). Translated into English as Mycenae: A Narrative of Researches and Discoveries at Mycenae and Tiryns (1878) (reissued by Cambridge University Press, 2010. )
Ilios, City and Country of the Trojans (1880) (reissued by Cambridge University Press, 2010. )
Orchomenos: Bericht über meine Ausgrabungen in Böotischen Orchomenos (1881) (reissued by Cambridge University Press, 2010. )
Tiryns: Der prähistorische Palast der Könige von Tiryns (1885) (reissued by Cambridge University Press, 2010. ). Translated into English Tiryns: The Prehistoric Palace of the Kings of Tiryns (1885)
Bericht über de Ausgrabungen in Troja im Jahre 1890 (1891) (reissued by Cambridge University Press, 2010. ).
 Heinrich Schliemann; Sophia Schliemann (ed.): Heinrich Schliemann's Autobiography. Leipzig, 1892. (Online version in German)

See also

List of archaeologists
List of polyglots

References

Sources

Bibliography

.

Further reading

External links

 
 
 American School of Classical Studies at Athens. .
 
 
 Schliemann's porky pies (lies) about excavating Troy - Curator's Corner S5 Ep11 from the British Museum
 Original Skizzen Heinrich Schliemann's zu dessen Werk Ilios  – photographic and drawing documentation of Schliemann's excavations prepared most probably for his publication Atlas trojanischer Alterthümer (1874)
 

1822 births
1890 deaths
People from Rostock (district)
People from the Grand Duchy of Mecklenburg-Schwerin
19th-century German non-fiction writers
19th-century German male writers
19th-century German archaeologists
Archaeologists from Mecklenburg-Western Pomerania
German philhellenes
Troy
Mycenaean archaeologists
Recipients of the Royal Gold Medal
University of Rostock alumni
German emigrants to the Netherlands
People of the California Gold Rush
German expatriates in Russia
German expatriates in the United States
German expatriates in Greece
German expatriates in Turkey
Burials at the First Cemetery of Athens
German expatriates in the Ottoman Empire
Members of the American Antiquarian Society